Nimzowitsch may refer to:

Aron Nimzowitsch
Nimzowitsch Defence